Manuel Maria Melo Machado Cerejeira Namora (born 12 February 1998) is a Portuguese professional footballer who plays for Felgueiras 1932 on loan from Boavista as a forward.

Club career
On 23 August 2017, Namora  made his professional debut with Braga B in a 2017–18 LigaPro match against Penafiel.

On 3 September 2019 it was confirmed, that Namora had returned to Rio Ave. He was registered for the club's U23-squad.

On 15 January 2021, Namora made his Primeira Liga debut with Rio Ave in a 1–1 away draw to Sporting CP.

On 17 August 2021, he signed a three-year contract with Boavista.

References

External links

1998 births
Footballers from Porto
Living people
Portuguese footballers
Association football forwards
Primeira Liga players
Liga Portugal 2 players
Campeonato de Portugal (league) players
S.C. Braga B players
Gondomar S.C. players
Rio Ave F.C. players
Boavista F.C. players
F.C. Felgueiras 1932 players